The 2021 BAL Finals was the championship game of the inaugural season of the Basketball Africa League (BAL). The final was played in the Kigali Arena in Kigali on 30 May 2021. The game was played between Egyptian club Zamalek and Tunisian club US Monastir.

Due to COVID-19 pandemic regulations, attendance in the arena was limited and 1,789 people were present. Zamalek defeated Tunisian side Monastir 76–63 to win its first BAL championship and second African championship, having won the 1992 continental title. As such, the team qualified for the 2021 FIBA Intercontinental Cup. Zamalek's Walter Hodge was named league MVP after the final.

Teams

Venue
On 1 August 2019, the Kigali Arena, built and opened in 2019, was announced as host of the Final Four of the BAL tournament. The arena has a capacity for approximately 10,000 people and hosted the AfroBasket 2021 qualifiers and Rwandan National Basketball League before.

The format of the league was later changed and the entire season was eventually played in Kigali. Due to the COVID-19 pandemic, attendance was limited and all spectators had to follow social distancing rules.

Background

US Monastir

US Monastir won the Pro A in 2019, to qualify for the inaugural BAL season. The team has also won the championship in 2020 and won the 2020–21 season on 27 April 2021, after defeating rivals Ezzahra Sports in the finals. to achieve a total of 6 titles in the league. On April 12, 2021, the team signed Mounir Ben Slimane as its new head coach.

In 2014, Monastir made its debut in the FIBA Africa Club Championship, Africa's top continental league, for the first time. In 2017, the club ended at third place in the continental league.

The Monastir team featured seven players who were also members of the Tunisian national team. During the BAL, the team impressed in the group stage by beating all its opponents and being the only team to achieve more than 100 points in a single game as they beat GNBC of Madagascar by 113 to 66. They qualified as the first seed to the play-offs and were deemed as "favourites" for the title prior to the league start by ESPN.

Zamalek

Zamalek won the Egyptian Super League in 2019, its first title in 11 years, to qualify for the inaugural BAL season. In the 1990s, the club had been successful at the continental level as well with a FIBA Africa Basketball League title in 1992 and a lost final in 1998. Adding up appearances in the former FIBA competition, this was Zamalek's fifth continental final.

It was the first season under Spanish head coach Augustí Julbe, who arrived from Gran Canaria. At the moment of playing in the BAL, Zamalek was still active in the semifinals of the 2020–21 Egyptian League. Ahead of the season, the team strengthened itself with Michael Fakuade, Mouloukou Diabate and Chinemelu Elonu. The team played impressive in the group stage, beating all three opponents to go into the playoffs as the second seed.

Road to the finals

Game

References

May 2021 sports events in Africa
Final
Sport in Kigali